Progonochaetus is a genus of beetles in the family Carabidae, containing the following species:

 Progonochaetus aeruginosus (Dejean, 1829) 
 Progonochaetus angolanus (Basilewsky, 1946) 
 Progonochaetus approximatus (H.Kolbe, 1897) 
 Progonochaetus arnoldi (Basilewsky, 1948) 
 Progonochaetus atrofuscus (Fairmaire, 1869) 
 Progonochaetus atroviridis (Fairmaire, 1869) 
 Progonochaetus bamboutensis (Basilewsky, 1948) 
 Progonochaetus basilewskyi Noonan, 1973 
 Progonochaetus bicoloripes (Burgeon, 1936) 
 Progonochaetus brittoni (Basilewsky, 1946) 
 Progonochaetus caffer (Boheman, 1848) 
 Progonochaetus chevalieri (Basilewsky, 1946) 
 Progonochaetus cookei (Basilewsky, 1953) 
 Progonochaetus cursorius (Dejean, 1831) 
 Progonochaetus decorsei (Basilewsky, 1948) 
 Progonochaetus dilatatus (Klug, 1853) 
 Progonochaetus discrepans (Basilewsky, 1946) 
 Progonochaetus eburneus (Basilewsky, 1950) 
 Progonochaetus gabonicus (Basilewsky, 1946) 
 Progonochaetus inchoatus (P?Ringuey, 1908) 
 Progonochaetus incrassatus (Boheman, 1848) 
 Progonochaetus indicus Kataev, 2002 
 Progonochaetus jeanneli (Basilewsky, 1946) 
 Progonochaetus jocquei Facchini, 2005 
 Progonochaetus kafakumbae (Basilewsky, 1949) 
 Progonochaetus kapangae (Burgeon, 1936) 
 Progonochaetus laeticolor (Chaudoir, 1876) 
 Progonochaetus laevistriatus Sturm, 1818
 Progonochaetus limbatus (Quedenfeldt, 1883) 
 Progonochaetus merus (Basilewsky, 1949) 
 Progonochaetus moestus (Chaudoir, 1878) 
 Progonochaetus nigricrus (Dejean, 1829) 
 Progonochaetus obscuripes (Laferte-Senectere, 1853) 
 Progonochaetus obtusus (Basilewsky, 1946) 
 Progonochaetus ochropus (Dejean, 1829) 
 Progonochaetus piceus (Dejean, 1829) 
 Progonochaetus planicollis (Putzeys, 1880) 
 Progonochaetus prolixus (Basilewsky, 1948) 
 Progonochaetus pseudochropus (Kuntzen, 1919) 
 Progonochaetus punctibasis Facchini, 2003 
 Progonochaetus rudebecki (Basilewsky, 1946) 
 Progonochaetus sakalava (Jeannel, 1948) 
 Progonochaetus sciakyi Facchini, 2003 
 Progonochaetus seyrigi (Jeannel, 1948) 
 Progonochaetus straneoi (Basilewsky, 1949) 
 Progonochaetus subcupreus (Chaudoir, 1876) 
 Progonochaetus vagans (Dejean, 1831) 
 Progonochaetus voltae (Basilewsky, 1948) 
 Progonochaetus xanthopus (Dejean, 1829)

References

Harpalinae